Chorsia albiscripta is a species of moth of the genus Chorsia and family Erebidae. This species is found on Sri Lanka, southern India, Japan, Borneo.

References 

Erebidae
Moths described in 1898